Alfred Charles Reid, O.J. (died 2 December 2019) served the Anglican Diocese of Jamaica as a bishop for over 30 years.

He was educated at St Peter's College Jamaica and ordained in 1960. His first post was a curacy in Montego Bay after which he held incumbencies at Vere and Stony Hill. He was  Suffragan Bishop of Montego Bay from 1980 to 2000 when he became the diocesan bishop, a position he held until 2012.

Notes

 

20th-century Anglican bishops in the Caribbean
Afro-Jamaican
Anglican bishops of Jamaica
Members of the Order of Jamaica
2019 deaths
Year of birth missing